Rådyr is a neighbourhood in the city of Kristiansand in Agder county, Norway. The neighborhood is located in the borough of Vågsbygd and in the district of Voiebyen. The neighborhood of Rådyr is north of Voielia, south of Kjos Haveby, east of Bråvann, and west of Kjosbukta.

Transport

References

Geography of Kristiansand
Neighbourhoods of Kristiansand